Thomas Jacobsen (born 13 September 1972) is a Danish sailor and Olympic champion. He won a gold medal in the Soling Class at the 2000 Summer Olympics in Sydney, together with Jesper Bank and Henrik Blakskjær.

References

External links

1972 births
Living people
Danish male sailors (sport)
Olympic sailors of Denmark
Olympic gold medalists for Denmark
Olympic medalists in sailing
Sailors at the 2000 Summer Olympics – Soling
European Champions Soling

Medalists at the 2000 Summer Olympics